Liutbert may refer to:
Liutpert, king of the Lombards (died 702)
Liutbert, Prince-Bishop of Münster (died 871), see Prince-Bishopric of Münster
Liutbert, Archbishop of Mainz (died 889)